Admiral Charles Lodowick Darley Waddilove (13 May 1828 – 17 October 1896) was a Royal Navy officer who went on to be Commander-in-Chief, The Nore.

Naval career
Born the son of Rev'd. William James Darley Waddilove, Charles Waddilove was appointed a lieutenant in the Royal Navy in 1849. Promoted to captain in 1862, he commanded HMS Adventure, HMS Pallas, HMS Inconstant and then HMS Asia. He was appointed Commander-in-Chief, The Nore in 1887 and retired in 1893.

He lived at Beacon Grange in Hexham.

Family
He married Mary Elizabeth Blackett-Ord; they had five daughters and three sons.

See also 
 Darley Waddilove, Charles' grandfather

References

1828 births
1896 deaths
Royal Navy admirals